Bhai Bhai (translation: Brother Brother) is a Hindi action film of Bollywood directed by Sikander Bharti and produced by Pahlaj Nihalani. It was released on 14 November 1997.

Plot 
Mafia don Jagraj wants to destroy the peace of India and capture Kashmir. He sends his right hand Goga to spread communal violence all over the country. The henchmen incite riots between Hindus and Muslims. Raghu is one of them, but in this course of action, his child gets killed. Ex-freedom fighter Pir Saheb prays to the communities to stop the bloody riot and finally succeeds. Broken-hearted, Raghu comes to Pir Saheb and informs that riots were pre-planned, Pir Saheb's close associate Mahadeb is involved with mastermind Mafia Jagraj. Initially, Pir Saheb does not believe it, but Raghu hands over a secret file to him before committing suicide. Pir Saheb challenges Mahadeb about his works. While he tries to make Mahadeb confess, Goga kills Pir Saheb. Now Goga deputes two friends, namely Veeru and Akbar to find that secret file.

Cast 
Samrat Mukerji as Akbar
Manek Bedi as Veeru
Ritu Shivpuri as Fulwa
Shakti Kapoor as Goga
Gulshan Grover as Jagraj
Prem Chopra as Police officer
Mac Mohan as Raghu
Sharat Saxena as Janardan
Ishrat Ali as Military officer
Sudhir as Doctor
Akshaye Khanna as Dancer in song Tera Naam Loonga. (special appearance)

Soundtrack
"Aankhen Jiski Mandir Masjid" - Kumar Sanu, Alka Yagnik, Udit Narayan, Sapna Mukherjee
"Chaand Nikla" - Kumar Sanu, Alka Yagnik, Sudesh Bhosle
"Chicklam Chicki" - Kumar Sanu
"Dil Dil Dil Dil" - Kumar Sanu, Alka Yagnik
"Halloo Halloo" - Abhijeet, Kavita Krishnamurthy
"Yeh Mausam" - Sudesh Bhosle, Alka Yagnik

References

External links
 

1997 films
1990s Hindi-language films
Indian action drama films
Films scored by Aadesh Shrivastava
Films about terrorism in India
1990s action drama films